Operation Killer was the start of the second major counter offensive launched by United Nations Command (UN) forces against the Chinese Communist People's Volunteer Army (PVA) and the North Korean Army (KPA) during the Korean War between 20 February and 6 March 1951. The offensive was formulated by General Matthew Ridgway with the goal of annihilating enemy forces south of a line designated the Arizona Line. The operation was immediately followed by Operation Ripper.

Background
After their defeats in the Battle of Chipyong-ni on 15 February 1951 and the Third Battle of Wonju (13-18 February), it became apparent that the PVA/KPA forces were retreating from the salient that they had created in the central region in the Chinese Fourth Phase Offensive. The withdrawal fit the pattern of earlier-observed PVA/KPA operations in which assault forces were obliged to pause for refitting after a week or so of battle. During the evening of 18 March, Ridgway planned an advance designed to deny the PVA/KPA any respite in which to prepare new attacks and, in particular, designed to destroy the enemy forces that were moving north out of the Chech’on salient. He intended that two principal thrusts by UN forces, up Route 29 from Wonju beyond Hoengsong and up Route 60 from Yongwol beyond P’yongch’ang, would block the main paths of PVA/KPA withdrawal. Other forces were to move through and clear the adjacent ground. The particular purpose of the attack made him call it Operation Killer.

When the codename chosen by Ridgway for the coming attack was heard in Washington, DC, he received a courteous but immediate protest from the Army Chief of Staff, General Collins, who indicated that the word "killer" was difficult to deal with in public relations. Ridgway nevertheless kept the name, which fully described his main objective.

The principal thrust up Route 29 was to be made by IX Corps, the one up Route 60 by X Corps. To accommodate the scheme of attack, the IX Corps-X Corps boundary was to be relocated east of Route 29 and the X Corps-Republic of Korea Army (ROK) III Corps boundary shifted to the east side of Route 60 when the advance was opened on 21 February.

The west flank of the advance would be adequately protected by US I Corps and 24th Infantry Division positions along the lower bank of the Han River. To protect the east flank, ROK III Corps was to send its leftmost division, the 7th Infantry Division, north through the heights east of Route 60, gauging the division's rate by the progress of X Corps. ROK III Corps' remaining divisions, the 9th and Capital Infantry Divisions, were to secure the lateral Route 20 winding southwest through the mountains out of Gangneung on the coast. If ROK III Corps commander Major General Yu Jae-hung was unable to develop continuous defenses above the road, he was at least to guarantee possession of Gangneung, the road's eastern gate. If necessary, Yu was to set the Capital Division in a strong perimeter around the coastal town, and Ridgway would see that the division thereafter was supplied by sea or air and supported by naval gunfire.

During the week past, as PVA forces broke up X Corps' Roundup advance and threatened to strike deep through the Han River valley, Ridgway had ordered the US 1st Marine Division up from Pohang, where it had been conducting anti-guerilla operations, to Chungju arriving on 18 February. Ridgway attached the division to IX Corps. The Marines were to relieve the US 2nd Infantry Division and 187th Airborne Regimental Combat Team (187th RCT) in the Wonju area, which on the 21st would fall within the zone of IX Corps. The 2nd Division and the 187th RCT then were to shift east and rejoin X Corps.

IX Corps commander Major General Bryant Moore chose the 1st Marine Division to make the IX Corps drive along Route 29. The division initially was to seize high ground just south of Hoengsong from which it could control that road center. To the west, the ROK 6th Infantry Division, British 27th Infantry Brigade and the US 1st Cavalry Division were to clear the mountains between the Marines and the Han. In the X Corps' zone, the US 7th Infantry Division and ROK 3rd Division were to open the advance to the Arizona Line; they were to be joined later by the 2nd Infantry Division after it shifted east from Wonju. The damaged ROK 5th and 8th Infantry Divisions were to move off the line, the 5th to help protect the Corps' supply route, the more severely reduced 8th to go south to Daegu, where it was to be rebuilt under ROK control.

The 187th RCT, when it moved from Wonju, was to assemble northeast of Chech’on ready to assist the 7th Division's attack. X Corps' commander General Almond was not to commit the unit, however, without Ridgway's approval. Depending on the favorable progress of Operation Killer, Ridgway intended to move the airborne troops to the Daegu airfield for refresher jump training. He was looking to possible future operations, in particular to plans prepared at his direction in January for the seizure of Seoul. These plans in part called for an airborne landing behind the capital to block enemy escape routes.

General Almond assigned the 7th Infantry Division to make the X Corps' thrust up Route 60 on the Corps' right flank. Almond wanted General Ferenbaugh then to block Route 20 to the northeast and at the same time strike west across the Corps' front along Route 20 to a juncture with IX Corps to seal off enemy forces remaining in the Chech’on salient. At the left of the Corps' zone, the ROK 3rd Infantry Division was to clear enemy forces from an area narrowing to a point on Route 20. The 2nd Infantry Division, less the 38th Infantry Regiment (which was to become Corps' reserve), was to start north on 22 February to clear a wide area of rough ground in the center of the Corps' zone and to occupy positions commanding Route 20. If the timing was right, General Ruffner's forces could hammer enemy units against an anvil provided by 7th Infantry Division troops driving west over Route 20.

Battle
By 21 February the PVA and KPA had had at least three days in which to withdraw from the salient and had given no indication that they would stop before they had moved north beyond the Arizona Line. If these forces were to be destroyed, Ridgway's assault had to advance rapidly, but the weather made speed impossible from the outset. For the first twenty days of February, weather conditions in the battle zone had been within their normal range. The average extremes of temperature varied from scarcely a degree above the freezing point to fifteen degrees below, and precipitation was largely snow that remained on the ground, sometimes as ice. An abrupt and unexpected change accompanied the opening of the operation. The temperature rose to almost 50 degrees on the 21st and that night barely fell to the freezing mark. The higher temperature range persisted during the remainder of the month. The 21st and the three days following saw steady to intermittent rainfall. Together, the unseasonable rain and warmer temperatures changed rivers and streams into courses of deep, fast water filled with floating ice. Fords became unusable, and low bridges were washed out or damaged beyond use. The rain and daytime thawing made quagmires of the roads and countryside, and landslides blocked or partially blocked tunnels, roads, and rail lines. Night freezes made the roads difficult to negotiate, especially where grades were steep and curves sharp. As a result, the operation became at once a plodding affair, not so much an advance with two main thrusts as a more uniform clearing operation in which assault forces fought hardest to overcome the effects of weather. Ahead of the advance, the PVA/KPA concentrated on evacuating the salient, leaving behind only scattered forces to fight occasional but strong delaying actions.

Ridgway kept a careful watch over the operation, reconnoitering much of the zone of advance from the air and questioning Corps' commanders closely during the first three days of the operation on the problems weather had created. Although Moore and Almond were experiencing difficulty in supplying the operation, neither advocated abandoning or postponing the advance. Frequent airdrops kept the supply problem from becoming critical, and by 25 February engineers had repaired much of the damage to main lines of communication. The advance continued, if far more slowly than anticipated.

About 10:30 on 24 February, the helicopter carrying Major General Moore crashed into the Han River and Moore subsequently died of a heart attack. He was temporarily replaced by 1st Marine Division commander Major General Oliver P. Smith.

Laboring forward through the remainder of February, Ridgway's central forces largely eliminated the PVA/KPA's recent ground gains. The two Corps thus were on or above the Arizona Line on the extreme west and east but somewhat short of it elsewhere.

Meanwhile, in the ROK III Corps' zone General Yu opened a lateral attack, sending two regiments of the Capital Division from the Gangneung area westward over Route 20 across the fronts of his other two divisions as a preliminary to establishing defenses above the road. Hit from both north and south by a regiment of the KPA 2nd Division, the ROK regiment lost almost a thousand men - 59 killed, 119 wounded and 802 missing. The damaged regiment returned to the Gangneung area to reorganize and Yu canceled what from the outset had been a decidedly risky movement.

To the west, in the meantime, those IX and X Corps units not yet on the Arizona Line continued their advances to reach it. By evening of 6 March all IX Corps' assault units had established positions near or slightly above the Arizona Line, the final advances encountering no resistance at all. The X Corps' units met stiff opposition over the first five days of March, particularly the 2nd Infantry Division as it attempted to occupy the high ground just above Route 20. But during the night of 5 March the KPA defenders vacated their positions, and by 7 March General Almond's forces were mostly in full possession of their Arizona objectives.

Aftermath
Over the fourteen days the two Corps took to reach and consolidate positions along the Arizona Line, each reported having inflicted substantial casualties. IX Corps alone reported 7,819 enemy killed, 1,469 wounded, and 208 captured. But from the outset it had become steadily clearer that the primary objective of Operation Killer of destroying all PVA/KPA forces below the Arizona Line would be only partially achieved. The PVA/KPA forces' head start in withdrawing, their disinclination to take a defensive stand below the objective line other than in spotty delaying actions and difficulties in negotiating the ground had prevented any other result.

References

External links
The Korean War: Operation Killer
2nd Infantry Division in the Korean War

Killer
Killer
Killer
Killer
Killer
February 1951 events in Asia
March 1951 events in Asia
Battles and operations of the Korean War in 1951  
Battles of the Korean War involving South Korea 
Battles of the Korean War involving North Korea 
Battles of the Korean War involving the United Kingdom 
Battles of the Korean War involving New Zealand